This is a list of the last monarchs in Europe.

See also 
 Monarchies in Europe

References 

Last Europe
History of Europe
Monarchs